Ragıp Gümüşpala (1897 – 6 June 1964) was the 11th Chief of the General Staff of the Turkish Armed Forces and founder of the Justice Party in 1961. He died shortly afterwards, on 6 June 1964, in Istanbul.

Biography

Military Life 
While he was a student at Edirne High School, he climbed into Talimgâha and in 1917 he was promoted to the rank of lieutenant. While he was Deputy Commander of the 63rd Regiment of the 12th Division, he was captured by the British on 2 October 1918 during the Battle of Nablus on the Sinai and Palestine Front. He remained in captivity until October 6, 1920. He returned from Istanbul to Ankara and joined the War of Independence on December 13, 1920. For his contributions to the National Struggle, he was awarded with the Red Stripe Medal of Independence. After serving as Team and Company Commander, he graduated from the War Academy, which he entered in 1931, and became a staff officer in the same year.

After serving in various headquarters and units, he was promoted to the rank of brigadier general in 1948, major general in 1951, lieutenant general in 1955 and general in 1959. With the rank of Brigadier General, 65th Division Infantry Brigade Command, Motorized Units School Command, 9th Division Deputy Commander and 3rd Army Chief of Staff, 65th Division Command with the rank of Major General and Deputy Commander of the 2nd Corps, 7th Corps Command and 3rd Army Corps with the rank of Lieutenant General. He served as the Deputy Commander of the Army.

In 1960, while he was Commander of the 3rd Army in the rank of general, the 27 May Coup happened. He asked the National Unity Committee, which made the coup in Ankara, who their leader was, and informed that if their leader was not a senior general, he would march to Ankara with the 3rd Army under his command and put an end to the rebellion. Thereupon, the juntaists brought retired general Cemal Gürsel from Izmir to Ankara by military plane and showed him the leader instead of Major General Cemal Madanoğlu, who was the most senior of the coup. He was appointed Chief of General Staff on 3 June 1960. On August 2, 1960, he was ex officio retired by the National Unity Committee, together with about 5000 officers who would later form the Retired Revolution Officers Association (EMINSU).

Political life 
He entered politics after military service. After the closure of the Democrat Party (DP) on September 29, 1960, he participated in the work of a political party that would gather the electorate of this party. He was elected as the first chairman of the Justice Party (AP), which was founded on February 11, 1961. As the first chairman of this party, he was elected as Izmir deputy in the 1961 general elections. He did not take part in the CHP-AP coalition government established on 20 November 1961 under the chairmanship of İsmet İnönü. He was re-elected as the chairman of the 1st Congress of the AP that convened in 1962.

He died in Istanbul on June 6, 1964. His grave is in Zincirlikuyu Cemetery. He was married with six children.

After his death, Süleyman Demirel was elected as the AP leader. Perceived as the continuation of DP, AP came to power alone with 52% of the votes in the 1965 elections.

References

External links
Ragıp GÜMÜŞPALA in the official website of the Turkish General Staff

1897 births
1964 deaths
People from Edirne
People from Adrianople vilayet
Justice Party (Turkey) politicians
20th-century Turkish politicians
Deputies of Izmir
Leaders of the Opposition (Turkey)
Turkish Army generals
Chiefs of the Turkish General Staff
Turkish military personnel of the Turkish War of Independence
Kuleli Military High School alumni
Ottoman Military Academy alumni
Turkish Military Academy alumni
Army War College (Turkey) alumni
Recipients of the Medal of Independence with Red Ribbon (Turkey)
Turkish political party founders